The year 1510 in science and technology included many events, some of which are listed here.

Medicine
 1510 Influenza pandemic - Summer – First known influenza pandemic, originating in Asia.

Technology
 Peter Henlein makes the first modern mechanical clock.

Births
 October 6 – John Caius, English physician and benefactor (died 1573)
 Giovanni Filippo Ingrassia, Sicilian anatomist (died 1580).
 Bernard Palissy, French ceramicist and hydraulic engineer (died c. 1589).
 'Denis Zachaire', French alchemist (died 1556)
 approx. date
 Ambroise Paré, French surgeon (died 1590).
 Francisco Vásquez de Coronado, Spanish conquistador (died 1554)

Deaths
 February 28 – Juan de la Cosa, Spanish cartographer and explorer (born c. 1460).

References

 
16th century in science
1510s in science